Setariidae is a family of nematodes belonging to the order Spirurida.

Genera:
 Dipetalonema Diesing, 1861

References

Nematodes